RMB Holdings Limited (RMBH), previously known as Rand Merchant Bank Holdings, is a South African diversified financial services holding company.

Overview 
RMB Holdings is listed on the JSE with its headquarters in Sandton, South Africa.

History 

RMB Holdings traces its roots from Rand Consolidated Investments (RCI) and Rand Merchant Bank that were founded in 1977 and 1968 respectively. RCI was co-founded by Paul Harris, Gerrit Ferreira and Lauritz Dippenaar. Its objective was to offer leveraged leasing and off-balance-sheet financing to businesses. RCI failed to secure a banking licence, this led to the firm joining forces with Johann Rupert's Rand Merchant Bank in 1985.  The newly created entity took up the Rand Merchant Bank name.

1987 to 2010 
In 1987, RMB Holdings was found as the holding company for the expanding Rand Merchant Bank. RMB Holdings was listed through a reverse listing when it took control of Momentum Life on 1 July 1992. RMB Holdings acquired 30% and 28.7% stake in Momentum Life from ABSA and Remgro respectively. RMB Holdings also transferred its entire stake in Rand Merchant Bank to Momentum thereby increasing its stake in Momentum Life to 76.4%. In the same year, the group founded Discovery Limited along with Adrian Gore as a subsidiary of Momentum Life.

On February 28, 1998 the group founded OUTsurance, a short-term insurance company. In April 1998, RMB Holdings entered into an agreement with Anglo American Corporation of South Africa (now Anglo American plc) to merge their financial services into a unified group. This merger gave rise to First Rand and was listed on the Johannesburg Stock Exchange on May 25, 1998, with Anglo American and RMB Holdings owning 20.43% and 25.03% of the authorized capital of FirstRand respectively. FirstRand had two main subsidiaries i.e. FirstRand Bank and FirstRand Insurance, holding banking and insurance investments respectively.

2011 to date 
On March 31, 2010, Momentum merged with Metropolitan Holdings to form MMI Holdings. This followed an agreement between the boards of Metropolitan Holdings, First Rand and Momentum Group.

In March 2011, RMB Holdings, Remgro and FirstRand entered into an agreement to restructure their insurance assets. This was done by spanning off their entire insurance portfolios (i.e. MMI Holdings, Discovery Limited, OUTsurance and RMB-SI Investments) to RMI Holdings, a wholly owned subsidiary of RMB Holdings and subsequently unbundling the entire shareholding in RMI Holdings to their shareholders. This restructure was completed on 7 March 2011. The shares of RMIH started trading at the JSE on the same day.RMB Structured Insurance Limited underwrites customer policy benefits for Prime Meridian Direct (Pty) Ltd.

After the RMI Holdings spin-off, the firm remained as a bank holding company.

Investments 
RMB Holdings' investment include:
 RMB Property – 100% Shareholding – This is the property arm of RMB Holding. It holds the following investments:
 Atterbury – 27.5% Shareholding – Atterbury is a developer of prime commercial, retail and industrial property across South Africa such as Mall of Africa, the rest of Africa and Europe.
 Propertuity – 34% Shareholding – Founded by Jonathan Liebmann, Propertuity is focused on the redevelopment of dilapidated industrial and office areas in Johannesburg and Durban.

RMB Holdings previously held a 34.1% stake in FirstRand which it unbundled to its shareholders in June 2020. This left the holding company with its property portfolio listed above as its only investments. Its stock is listed on the JSE and the Namibian Stock Exchange.

Ownership 
The shares of RMB Holdings are listed on the JSE.  the shareholding of RMB Holdings was as follows:

Governance 
RMB Holdings is governed by a sixteen-person board of directors with Gerrit Thomas Ferreira as the chairman of the board and Dalu Ajene as the CEO. This structure is similar to that of RMI Holdings since the two firms same their management team and resources under a management contract.

See also

References 

Banks of South Africa
Companies based in Sandton
Insurance companies of South Africa
Financial services companies established in 1987
Banks established in 1987
Companies listed on the Johannesburg Stock Exchange
Financial services companies of South Africa